Nazif Kayacık (1872 in Constantinople (Istanbul) – March 20, 1951 in Istanbul) was an officer of the Ottoman Army and a general of the Turkish Army.

Medals and decorations
Order of the Medjidie
Order of Osminieh
Silver Medal of the Battle of Greece
Silver Medal of Liyakat
Gallipoli Star (Ottoman Empire)
Silver Medal of Imtiyaz
Iron Cross
Order of the Iron Crown (Austria)
Medal of Independence with Red Ribbon & Citation

See also
List of high-ranking commanders of the Turkish War of Independence

Sources

1872 births
1951 deaths
Military personnel from Istanbul
Ottoman Military Academy alumni
Ottoman Army officers
Ottoman military personnel of the Greco-Turkish War (1897)
Ottoman military personnel of the Italo-Turkish War
Ottoman military personnel of the Balkan Wars
Ottoman military personnel of World War I
Turkish military personnel of the Turkish War of Independence
Turkish military personnel of the Greco-Turkish War (1919–1922)
Turkish Army generals
Burials at Turkish State Cemetery
Recipients of the Order of the Medjidie
Recipients of the Silver Liakat Medal
Recipients of the Silver Imtiyaz Medal
Recipients of the Iron Cross (1914)
Recipients of the Medal of Independence with Red Ribbon (Turkey)